The Manoir de la Borie-Fricart is a château in the Dordogne, Aquitaine, France.

Châteaux in Dordogne